is a gymnast from Japan. She participated in the 2005 World Rhythmic Gymnastics Championships.

References

1988 births
Living people
Place of birth missing (living people)
Japanese rhythmic gymnasts
Female gymnasts
21st-century Japanese women